William Beare was Dean of Lismore from 1999 to 2008.

He was born in 1933, educated at the Trinity College, Dublin and ordained in 1960.  After curacies at Waterford and Cork he held incumbencies in Rathcormac, Monkstown and Stradbally.

References

1933 births
Alumni of Trinity College Dublin
Deans of Lismore
Living people